Borrrowdale may refer to:

 Borrowdale, a valley in the English Lake District in Cumbria, England
 Borrowdale, Westmorland, a valley in the southeast of the English Lake District
 Borrowdale, Harare, a suburb in Harare, Zimbabwe
 Borrowdale (1785 ship), a storeship of the First Fleet that sank in a storm in 1789
 Borrowdale (1985 ship) a First Fleet-class ferry named after Borrowdale (1785 ship) operating on Sydney Harbour.